is a Japanese all girl brass and rock band, formed in 2005. There are 10 members in this group and every member plays musical instruments.

In 2007, Pistol Valve performed at SXSW as part of the Japan Nite tour.

Members
cotton: Alto saxophone and vocals, leader
: Tenor saxophone and vocals
: Violin and vocals
: Euphonium and vocals
: Tenor and baritone saxophone
: Trombone
: Trumpet
Misaty: Trumpet
M-chan: Trumpet
: Turntable

Former members
: Alto sax
Bancho♀: Euphonium
: Euphonium

Discography

Single 
 "Pull The TRIGGER!" (15 March 2006)
 
 
 "Zutto-Zutto" (21 November 2007)
 "Unofficial" (6 August 2008)
 "My Voice" (22 July 2009)

Mini-album 
 Pistol-Whip (19 July 2006)

Album 
 Tsunamic Girls From Tokyo (American debut album) (24 July 2007)
 RATATATTAT! (23 January 2008)
 Stick 'em up! (22 October 2008)
 Love Love Gun (7 October 2009)

Rental album 
 TRIAL SHOOT! (14 June 2009)
 "Good-looking dreamer"
 
 "Pull The TRIGGER!"
 
 "Fo-Fo"
 "My Generation〜Respect to The Who〜"
 "THE BEST HOUSE"

DVDs

References

External links
Official Website 

Japanese rock music groups
All-female bands